Electoral district III (Croatian: III. izborna jedinica) is one of twelve electoral districts of Croatian Parliament.

Boundaries 
Electoral district III consist of:

 whole Krapina-Zagorje County;
 whole Varaždin County;
 whole Međimurje County.

Election

2000 Elections 
 

SDP - HSLS
 Zdravko Tomac
 Baltazar Jalšovec
 Dragica Zgrebec
 Miroslav Korenika
 Ivan Čehok
 Sonja Borovčak
 Zorko Vidiček
 Željko Pavlic

HDZ
 Ivan Jarnjak
 Hrvoje Vojvoda
 Velimir Pleša
 Krunoslav Gašparić

HSS - LS - HNS
 Luka Trconić
 Zvonimir Sabati

2003 Elections 
 

HDZ
 Ivan Jarnjak
 Vladimir Kurečić
 Velimir Pleša
 Marijan Mlinarić

SDP - LIBRA
 Tonino Picula
 Dragica Zgrebec
 Miroslav Korenika
 Željko Pavlic

HNS
 Radimir Čačić
 Dragutin Lesar

HSS
 Zvonimir Sabati

HSU
 Josip Sudec

HSLS - DC
 Ivan Čehok

HDSS
 Ivo Lončar

2007 Elections 
 

SDP
 Ljubo Jurčić
 Dragica Zgrebec
 Ivan Hanžek
 Nadica Jelaš
 Mario Habek

HNS
 Radimir Čačić
 Dragutin Lesar
 Danica Hursa
 Zlatko Koračević

HDZ
 Ivan Jarnjak
 Božo Biškupić
 Sunčana Glavak
 Vladimir Ivković

HSLS - HSS - ZDS
 Ivan Čehok

2011 Elections 
 

SDP - HNS - IDS - HSU
 Radimir Čačić
 Siniša Hajdaš Dončić
 Nadica Jelaš
 Sonja Konig
 Mario Habek
 Milorad Batinić
 Željko Kolar
 Mario Moharić
 Natalija Martinčević
 Anđelko Topolovec

HDZ
 Tomislav Karamarko
 Domagoj Ivan Milošević
 Sunčana Glavak

HL SR
 Dragutin Lesar

2015 Elections 

SDP - HNS - HSU - HL SR - A-HSS - ZS
 Siniša Hajdaš Dončić
 Matija Posavec
 Predrag Štromar
 Milorad Batinić
 Dragica Zgrebec
 Marija Puh
 Tomislav Končevski
 Mario Habek

HDZ - HSS - HSP AS - BUZ - HSLS - HRAST - HDS - ZDS
 Žarko Tušek
 Darko Horvat
 Anđelko Stričak
 Ladislav Ilčić

Most
 Robert Podolnjak

NS R - NH - SHU - ZF - DDS
 Radimir Čačić

2016 Elections 
 

SDP - HNS - HSS - HSU
 Siniša Hajdaš Dončić
 Matija Posavec
 Milorad Batinić
 Predrag Štromar
 Stjepan Kovač
 Mario Habek
 Marija Puh
 Marko Vešligaj

HDZ
 Žarko Tušek
 Darko Horvat
 Anđelko Stričak
 Josip Križanić

ŽZ - PH - AM - HDSS - Abeceda - MS
 Vladimira Palfi

Most
 Robert Podolnjak

2020 Elections 
 

SDP - HSS - HSU - SNAGA - GLAS - IDS - PGS
 Matija Posavec
 Siniša Hajdaš Dončić
 Željko Kolar
 Barbara Antolić Vupora
 Stjepan Kovač
 Andreja Marić

HDZ
 Žarko Tušek
 Darko Horvat
 Siniša Jenkač
 Anđelko Stričak
 Damir Habijan

DP - HS - BLOK - HKS - HRAST - SU - ZL
 Davor Dretar

HNS
 Predrag Štromar

NS R - HSS BR - SHU
 Radimir Čačić

References 

Electoral districts in Croatia